KAMX (94.7 FM "Mix 94.7") is a commercial radio station licensed to Luling, Texas, and serving the Greater Austin radio market.  It is owned by Audacy, Inc. and airs a hot adult contemporary radio format.  The station has studios and offices on Westbank Drive, off Loop 360, near Westlake High School.

The transmitter is off Buchman Mountain Road in Austin, amid numerous towers for other FM and TV stations.  KAMX broadcasts at 99,000 watts (100,000 with beam tilt), giving KAMX one of the best FM signals in the Austin market, audible from the northern suburbs of San Antonio to Killeen and Temple.

On-Air Staff
KAMX's air staff includes Booker, Alex and Sara in morning drive time (Brad Booker, Alex Franco, and Sara Osburn), midday host Heather Rivera and afternoon host Sean Mack.

History 
On March 22, 1987, the station signed on as KAPT.  It was owned by Mark Grubbs, who also served as general manager. The station debuted with a hybrid Top 40/Country music format under the name "Capital FM," with the call sign spelling out "Kapital."  (Austin is the capital of Texas.)

KAPT found little initial success against established Top 40 stations KHFI and KBTS (now KGSR).  The station experimented with other formats including beautiful music, country music "The Country Kat" KATG, oldies "Froggy 94" KFGI, and Dance/CHR "Party 94.7" KPTY.

In 1994, the Amaturo Radio Group bought the station for $2.5 million. On October 24, 1994, "Froggy 94" switched to "Party 94.7", removing the only oldies station at the time in Austin. On September 1, 1995, Amaturo changed the station's format to Modern Adult Contemporary as "Mix 94.7" with the call sign KAMX.  In 1998, the station changed hands again, this time being acquired by Infinity Broadcasting.  Infinity was later merged into CBS Radio.

Over time, KAMX moved from Modern AC to Hot AC.  In 2006, CBS announced it would sell 15 radio stations across the country to Entercom, including KAMX.  The ownership change became official on November 30, 2007.  Coincidentally, CBS Radio merged into Entercom in 2017, with most of the former CBS Radio stations now owned by Entercom.

In the fall of 2008, morning duo J.B. & Sandy renewed their contracts with Entercom for five years, keeping them on the air through the end of 2013 at which time their contracts were not renewed.

References

External links

AMX
Radio stations established in 1987
Audacy, Inc. radio stations